Solar Euromed is a high technology group based in France specialized in concentrated solar power technology, in activity from 2007 to 2016.

The company provides proprietary solar thermal power systems which produce heat for power generation and industrial applications with the built-in ability to store energy and supply electricity on demand, even after sunset. Solar Euromed's solar thermal technology is based on the concept of direct steam generation and linear Fresnel optics and was developed together with the French National Centre for Scientific Research and the French Atomic Energy and Alternative Energies Commission.

History
Since its inception, Solar Euromed has been an active promoter of CSP technology in Europe.

 In 2007, Solar Euromed developed the Solenha project ultimately classified as Seveso enabling a greater knowledge in the environmental impact assessment of parabolic trough technology.
 In 2009, the group launched its technology development plan funded by the French innovation fund Oseo and the European Union which initially resulted in a Fresnel-based pilot plant located at the Themis solar energy R&D platform in the Pyreneans.
 In 2010, the company signed a 2 GW agreement with the Republic of Sudan for the development, construction and operation of CSP plants to be implemented over the next decade. Few weeks later, Solar Euromed signed a power purchase agreement for the realization of the first 250 MW.
 In 2011,  it secured in Corsica a construction permit for the implementation of the largest solar thermal power plant in France set to demonstrate Solar Euromed’s proprietary Fresnel-based technology at utility scale.
 In September 2015, the company was placed under administration. It was finally shut down in September 2016.

Concentrated solar power
CSP technologies concentrate energy from the sun’s rays to heat a fluid to high temperatures. This heat is transformed into mechanical energy and then into electricity. Using the sun as a free source of energy, structures made out of metal and glass and completely greenhouse gas (GHG) emission-free, Concentrated Solar Power is a sustainable and environmentally friendly solution to produce a clean and renewable energy.

CSP is a proven technology and the first plants began operating in California in the 80’s, spurred by federal and state tax incentives and mandatory long-term power purchase contracts. A drop in fossil fuel prices then led the federal and state governments to dismantle the policy framework that had supported the advancement of CSP. In 2006, the market re-emerged in Spain and the United States, supported by changes in governmental policies favorable to renewable energies – and solar in particular. CSP uses renewable solar resource to generate electricity while producing no GHG emissions (SOX, CO2) with large scale power capacities. CSP plants can be combined with thermal storage capacity so as to avoid intermittency due to clouds, or to provide the grid with electricity in the evening, during peak hours, and throughout the night. CSP plants can also provide power generation during off-solar hours thanks to hybridization either with gas or biomass. While the bulk of CSP electricity will come from large, on-grid power plants, these technologies also show significant potential for supplying other specific needs such as water desalination, off-grid power, combined heat and power generation, process heat, oil & gas pumping, and solar fuels generation.

Technology
Solar Euromed's technology use long and narrow segments of mirror that pivot to reflect the sunlight onto a fixed absorber tube located at the common focal line of the reflectors. A secondary reflector enables to have a higher heat flux and homogeneous heating of the absorber tube which can generate temperatures up to 450 °C. Solar Euromed's solutions include a large scale assembly of Fresnel reflector modules working with direct steam generation at high temperature, a thermal storage capacity, a scheme of assembly enabling farming under the reflectors due to the high positioning of the structures, and the use of recyclable materials limiting waste during the dismantling and the environmental impact.

Advantages of the technology

Fresnel technology has CSP’s best land-to-electricity ratio due to a compact design and the usability of space below support structures. This technology is also considered to be cheaper to implement and allows a strong construction modularity. Fresnel system requires flat or less-shaped mirrors and facilitates Direct Steam Generation, eliminating the need for costly heat transfer fluids and heat exchangers. Moreover, operations and maintenance are easy, hence, the associated costs are moderate.

Pilot Plant

In partnership with two leading French R&D centers (CNRS and CEA), Solar Euromed has implemented this landmark technology development into a fully instrumented MW-size pilot plant called Augustin Fresnel 1 located in the French Pyreneans.

Alba Nova 1

Located at Ghisonaccia in Corsica, Alba Nova 1 is Solar Euromed's CSP demonstration plant for which a construction permit was already secured for a net power output of 12 MW producing electricity equivalent of the consumption of 10 000 households, thus serving as a bridge between the pilot phase and the anticipated deployment in the MENA region. It is the first CSP project to be authorized in France since more than 30 years and serves as a reference for the energy conversion and economic performance of Solar Euromed’s Fresnel proprietary technology. Due to its insularity, Corsica has specific energetic constraints to operate with limited connections to an external network, protection of environment, fire, and has to manage the downward looking lifecycle of two fossil-powered thermal power plants.

See also
List of concentrating solar thermal power companies
List of solar thermal power stations

References

Solar energy companies
Technology companies of France
Solar thermal energy
Renewable resource companies established in 2007
French brands
Dijon
Energy companies disestablished in 2016
Renewable energy companies of France
French companies established in 2007